Bor railway station is a railway station in the town of Bor, Niğde in Turkey. The station consists of one side platform and one island platform serving three tracks. TCDD Taşımacılık operates a daily intercity train, the Erciyes Express, from Kayseri to Adana.

Bor station was built in 1933 by the Turkish State Railways.

References

External links
TCDD Taşımacılık
Passenger trains
Station information
Station timetable

Railway stations in Niğde Province
Railway stations opened in 1933
1933 establishments in Turkey